is an interchange passenger railway station located in the city of Shingū, Wakayama Prefecture, Japan, jointly operated by JR West and JR Central.

Overview 
Shingū Station is the main railway station in Shingū, and plays an important role in the operation of the Kisei Main Line. The jurisdiction of the Kisei Main Line is divided at Shingū Station. The section of the line southwest of Shingū Station falls under JR West's jurisdiction and the section northeast of Shingū Station falls under JR Tōkai's jurisdiction. In addition, the station serves as the border for electrification, as the JR Tōkai portion of the line running is not electrified. There is a sign stating the boundary between the two companies at the North entrance of the Tankaku tunnel.

Lines
Shingū Station is served by the Kisei Main Line (Kinokuni Line), and is located 180.2 kilometers from the terminus of the line at Kameyama Station.

Station layout
The station consists of one island platform and one side platform connected to the station building by an underground passage. The station has a Midori no Madoguchi staffed ticket office. There are 31 coin operated luggage lockers at this station, which may be rented for up to three days.

Platforms

History
Shingū Station opened on the Shingu Railway on March 1, 1913. The Shingu Railway was nationalized on July 1, 1934, and the station was relocated 40 meters to the south of its original location on May 30, 1928. The station building burned down due to a fire which began in the checked luggage storage room on January 21, 1951. With the privatization of the Japan National Railways (JNR( on April 1, 1987, the station came under the aegis of the West Japan Railway Company (JR West) and the Japan Freight Railway Company (JR Freight). Freight operations were terminated from March 16, 1996.

Passenger statistics
In fiscal 2019, the station was used by an average of 920 passengers daily (boarding passengers only).

Surrounding area
 Shingū Castle
 Shingu City Museum of History and Folklore
 Ukijima no Mori
 Kumano River
 Shingu City Hall
 Shingu City Library

See also
List of railway stations in Japan

References

External links

 Shingū Station (West Japan Railway) 

Railway stations in Wakayama Prefecture
Railway stations in Japan opened in 1913
Shingū, Wakayama